Russ Parent (born May 6, 1968) is a Canadian retired ice hockey defenseman who was an All-American for North Dakota.

Career
Parent was a high-scoring defenseman in his final season of junior hockey, recording nearly 2 points per game in 1986. The gaudy numbers convinced the New York Rangers to select him with their 11th round selection in the 1986 NHL Draft. Parent joined the program at North Dakota the following year and lucked into one of the most dominant performances by any team I the history of college hockey. UND became the first team to win 40 games and were led by all-time single-season scoring champion Tony Hrkac as well as future Hall of Famer Ed Belfour. The Fighting Sioux won the National Championship with Parent serving mostly as a depth defender.

With many of the principle players leaving after the season, North Dakota declined sharply after 1987. parent remained with the team for the next three seasons, trying to rebuild the team into a contender. The Fighting Hawks finally began to resemble a championship team in his senior season. While serving as an alternate captain, Parent led the nation in points (tied) and assists by a defenseman and was named an All-American. Parent helped the Sioux return to the national tournament again but they were knocked out in the first round. He finished out the season with three games for the Canadian national team.

Parent began his professional career the following season after heading to Europe. He played for the Ayr Raiders in final two seasons for the team and then transferred to the Basingstoke Bison. In his first season he produced more than two points per game and helped the team qualify for the British Hockey League. He continued to be a key contributor for the Bison for the next three years and is still fondly remembered by supporters of the club. He moved on to the Fife Flyers for the 1997 season and helped the team win a league championship.

After a successful career in the UK, Parent returned across the Atlantic and played four years of AA hockey with the Monroe Moccasins. He retired following the 2001 season.

Statistics

Regular season and playoffs

Awards and honors

References

External links

1968 births
Living people
Ice hockey people from Winnipeg
Canadian ice hockey defencemen
Winnipeg South Blues players
North Dakota Fighting Hawks men's ice hockey players
AHCA Division I men's ice hockey All-Americans
Ayr Bruins players
Basingstoke Bison players
Fife Flyers players
Monroe Moccasins players
NCAA men's ice hockey national champions
New York Rangers draft picks
Canadian expatriate ice hockey players in Scotland
Canadian expatriate ice hockey players in England
Canadian expatriate ice hockey players in the United States